The 2019 Sun Belt Conference Football Championship Game was a college football game played on Saturday, December 7, 2019, at Kidd Brewer Stadium in Boone, North Carolina, to determine the 2019 champion of the Sun Belt Conference. The game, the conference's second championship game, featured the East division champions Appalachian State and the West division champions Louisiana Ragin' Cajuns.

Previous season
The 2018 Sun Belt Conference Football Championship Game featured East Division champion Appalachian State against West Division champion Louisiana Ragin' Cajuns for the first title game for the conference. The Mountaineers defeated the Ragin' Cajuns by a score of 30–19.

Teams
The 2019 Sun Belt Conference Football Championship Game was contested by the Appalachian State Mountaineers, East Division champions, and the Louisiana Ragin' Cajuns, West Division champions. The teams had met 7 times previously, with the Mountaineers holding a 7–0 edge in the series. The teams' most recent meeting was earlier in the 2019 season; Appalachian State won, 17–7. Louisiana had yet to win in the series, since they first met in 2014 This was the teams' second meeting in the Sun Belt Conference Football Championship Game, a rematch from the previous year.

Appalachian State
Appalachian State clinched its spot in the Championship Game after its November 23 win over Texas State. The Mountaineers secured hosting rights on November 29 with a 48–13 win over Troy. This is Appalachian State's second consecutive and overall appearance in the Championship Game.

Louisiana 
The Louisiana Ragin' Cajuns earned their spot after clinching the West Division title on November 23 with a win over Troy. This will be the Ragin' Cajuns' second consecutive and overall appearance in the Championship Game.

Game summary

Statistics

See also
List of Sun Belt Conference football champions

References

Championship
Sun Belt Conference Football Championship Game
Appalachian State Mountaineers football games
Louisiana Ragin' Cajuns football games
Sun Belt Conference Football Championship
December 2019 sports events in the United States